Guilherme Afonso (born 15 November 1985) is a professional footballer who plays as a striker for Mendrisio-Stabio. He has dual Angolan-Swiss nationality.

Club career
Afonso has played club-football in Switzerland for Étoile Carouge, Sion, Grasshopper, Lugano and FC Vaduz; in France for Valence; and in the Netherlands for Twente and Veendam. In 2009 he scored the winning goal as Sion defeated BSC Young Boys 3-2 in the Swiss Cup Final.

In the summer 2012 he signed a two-year contract with FC Vaduz. In the summer of 2013 he signed a year and half contract with Primeiro de Agosto.

Afonso signed with Mendrisio-Stabio in December 2018.

International career
Afonso, who has previously played for Switzerland at under-21 level, was selected by Angola for the 2013 Africa Cup of Nations.

International goals
Scores and results list Angola's goal tally first.

Honours 
Sion
Swiss Cup: 2008–09

References

External links

Guilherme Afonso at Footballdatabase

1985 births
Living people
Swiss men's footballers
Switzerland under-21 international footballers
Angolan footballers
ASOA Valence players
C.D. Primeiro de Agosto players
Kabuscorp S.C.P. players
Étoile Carouge FC players
FC Sion players
FC Twente players
SC Veendam players
Eredivisie players
Eerste Divisie players
Urania Genève Sport players
Angolan emigrants to Switzerland
Naturalised citizens of Switzerland
Angolan expatriate footballers
Angolan expatriate sportspeople in the Netherlands
Swiss expatriate footballers
Expatriate footballers in the Netherlands
Swiss expatriate sportspeople in the Netherlands
Footballers from Luanda
2013 Africa Cup of Nations players
Angolan expatriate sportspeople in Switzerland
Angola international footballers
Association football forwards